Bridgman's View Tower is a proposed 66-story mixed use skyscraper in the Northern Liberties neighborhood of Philadelphia, Pennsylvania. Planned to rise , the building would be the fifth tallest in the city.

The building, designed by Philadelphia-based architecture firm Agoos/Lovera, would rise near the city's Delaware River waterfront. It is being developed by Marc Stien with the support of the Ironworker's Union Local 401. The scope of the project includes 794 high-end condominium units, a 200 to 300 room boutique hotel and an enclosed shopping plaza. There are 'green' components to the buildings, such as a rooftop garden.

If completed, Bridgman's View Tower would be much larger than other buildings in its immediate vicinity. The Northern Liberties neighborhood is well removed physically from the core of skyscrapers that exist in Center City although the area has, over the past few years, become a popular locale for developers and several large scale projects are proposed in addition to Bridgman's View.

The project's original completion date of 2010 is now in doubt as the land for the project was recently placed up for auction.

External links
 SkyscraperPage Forum - Bridgman's View Tower
 Agoos Lovera's Bridgman's View Tower

Skyscrapers in Philadelphia
Condo hotels in the United States
Proposed skyscrapers in the United States
Retail buildings in Pennsylvania